Pablo Sergio Martínez da Rosa (born 8 March 1989) is a Uruguayan footballer who plays as a midfielder. He is currently a free agent.

Career
Martínez spent the first three years of his career with La Luz, scoring one goal in fifty-five appearances for the Uruguayan Segunda División club. In 2009, Martínez joined Cerrito of the Uruguayan Primera División. He made his top-flight debut for the club on 9 December during a win away to Atenas. Five further appearances followed during 2009–10, a campaign which ended with relegation. Martínez remained for the next season, featuring seven more times as they won promotion back up. He subsequently departed.

Career statistics
.

References

External links

1989 births
Living people
Place of birth missing (living people)
Uruguayan footballers
Association football midfielders
Uruguayan Segunda División players
Uruguayan Primera División players
La Luz F.C. players
Sportivo Cerrito players